La Forêt-Fouesnant (or simply Ar Forest) is a commune in the Finistère department in Brittany in northwestern France. La Forêt-Fouesnant is bordered to the south by the Baie de La Forêt.

Population
Inhabitants of La Forêt-Fouesnant are called Forestois.

See also

Communes of the Finistère department

References

External links

Official website 

Mayors of Finistère Association 

Communes of Finistère